Jerry Before Seinfeld is a 2017 stand-up comedy film that follows comedian Jerry Seinfeld as he returns for a stand-up routine at the New York City comedy club, Comic Strip Live, which started his career. The album of the special was nominated for a 2018 Grammy Award for Best Comedy Album. This is his third special, and first with Netflix.

Influences 
In the Netflix comedy special, Jerry Before Seinfeld, Jerry displayed his personal comedy album collection from when he was a teenager. 
These albums included:
Lenny Bruce's - Thank You Masked Man (1972)
Bill Cosby's - I Started Out as a Child (1961)
George Carlin's - Class Clown (1972)
Steve Martin's - Let's Get Small (1977)
Bob Newhart's - The Button-Down Mind of Bob Newhart (1960)
Mike Nichols and Elaine May's - Improvisations to Music (1958)
Mel Brooks and Carl Reiner's - 2000 and One Years with Carl Reiner and Mel Brooks (1961)

There is also a brief montage of comedians who Seinfeld admired, Lenny Bruce, Richard Pryor, Jonathan Winters. Seinfeld also talked about the influence Mad Magazine had on him.

Reception
On Rotten Tomatoes the film holds an approval rating of 95% based 19 reviews, with an average rating of 7.35/10. The site's critical consensus reads, "Jerry Before Seinfeld finds its star revisiting his earliest material on his hometown stage, offering appropriately familiar - yet still abundant - laughs along the way."

Formats
In addition to streaming, the audio is available on a double-vinyl record released September 29, 2017.

References

External links
 

Jerry Seinfeld albums
Stand-up comedy concert films
Netflix specials
2010s American television specials
Comedy albums by American artists
Spoken word albums by American artists
Live albums by American artists
Live comedy albums
2010s comedy albums
2017 live albums
2017 video albums
2017 in New York City
Stand-up comedy albums
2010s English-language films